This is a list of movable observances within Western Christianity. It includes secular observances which are calculated by religious observances.

This list does not necessarily imply either official status nor general observance.

Movable Christian observances, 2021

January
First Sunday of the year, unless the Sunday falls on January 1, 6, or 7, then January 2: January 5 
Feast of the Holy Name of Jesus (Roman Catholicism, according to the General Roman Calendar of 1960)First Monday: January 6 Handsel Monday (Scotland and Northern England)Monday after January 6: January 12Baptism of the Lord – (Western Christianity in countries where Epiphany is celebrated on January 7 or 8)Sunday following January 6: January 12 Baptism of the Lord (Roman Catholicism, Anglicanism, Lutheranism, in countries where Epiphany is celebrated on January 7 or 8) 
Plough Sunday (England)Day after Plough Sunday: January 13 Plough Monday (England)Third Sunday: January 19 Feast of the Santo Niño (Philippines)

February9th Sunday before Easter in Western Christianity: February 9 Septuagesima Sunday2nd Sunday before Ash Wednesday (Western Christianity): February 16  
Sexagesima Last Thursday before Lent (Western Christianity): February 20Fat ThursdaySaturday before Ash Wednesday: February 22 
Festum Ovorum (University of Oxford)Sunday before Ash Wednesday (Western Christianity): February 23Quinquagesima Monday before Ash Wednesday: February 24 Shrove Monday 
Fastelavn (Denmark/Norway)
Nickanan Night (Cornwall)
Rosenmontag (Germany)Tuesday before Ash Wednesday: February 25 Shrove Tuesday 
Fastnacht (Pennsylvania Dutch)
Feast of the Holy Winding Sheet of Christ
Fettisdagen (Sweden)
Laskiainen (Finland, Finnish-Americans)
Mardi Gras
National Pancake Day (Netherlands)
Powder Day (Tolox, Spain)
Užgavėnės (Lithuania)46 days before Easter: February 26Ash Wednesday/Lent 
National No Smoking Day (Ireland)Friday after Ash Wednesday: February 28 Feast of the Crown of Thorns

MarchFirst Sunday of Lent: March 1 People's Sunday (Żabbar, Malta) 
Quadragesima SundayMarch 19, unless the 19th is a Sunday, then March 20: March 19  Feast of Joseph of Nazareth (Western Christianity)
Father's Day (Spain, Portugal, Belgium, Italy, Honduras, and Bolivia)
Las Fallas, celebrated on the week leading to March 19. (Valencia)
"Return of the Swallow", annual observance of the swallows' return to Mission San Juan Capistrano in California.Fourth Sunday of Lent, 21 days before Easter Sunday: March 22 Laetare Sunday
Mothering Sunday
Pretzel Sunday (Luxembourg)Fifth Sunday of Lent: March 29Passion Sunday (celebrated in the extraordinary form of the Roman Rite according to the General Roman Calendar of 1960)

AprilWeek before Easter: Holy Week
Palm Sunday: April 5 
Holy Monday: April 6
Holy Tuesday: April 7
Holy Wednesday: April 8
Maundy Thursday: April 9
Good Friday: April 10Second Friday of April: April 10 Fast and Prayer Day (Liberia)
Holy Saturday: April 11Easter Week: April 12-18 Easter: April 12  (Eastertide begins)
Aberri Eguna (Basque)
Lieldienas (Latvia)
Easter Monday: April 13
Family Day (South Africa)
Śmigus-Dyngus, regional variant of Easter Monday (Poland, Ukraine)
 Easter Tuesday: April 14(Public holiday in Tasmania)
 Easter Wednesday: April 15
Saint Gregory's Day (Żejtun, Malta)
 Easter Thursday: April 16
 Easter Friday: April 17
 Easter Saturday: April 18Sunday after Easter: April 19Divine Mercy SundaySunday before Earth Day (April 22): April 19 Earth Day Sunday

MayThird Sunday after Easter: May 3Jubilate SundayMonday and Tuesday in the week following the third Sunday of Easter: May 4–5Hocktide (England) Fourth Sunday after Easter: May 10Cantate Sunday
Good Shepherd Sunday Fourth Friday after Easter: May 15Store Bededag (Denmark)Third Sunday of May: Feast of Our Lady of the AudienceSunday preceding the Rogation days: May 17Rogation Sunday  Monday, Tuesday, and Wednesday preceding Feast of the Ascension: May 18–20Minor Rogation days 39 days after Easter: May 21Feast of the Ascension
Father's Day (Germany)
Festa della Sensa  (Venice)
Global Day of Prayer	
Sheep Festival (Cameroon)Seventh Sunday/49 days after Easter: May 31Pentecost begins
Whitsun

JuneDay after Whitsun: June 1Whit Monday
Memorial of the Blessed Virgin Mary, Mother of the Church
Azores Day (Portugal)Day after Whit Monday: June 2Whit TuesdayFirst Thursday after start of Pentecost: June 4Friday of the week of Whitsun: June 5Whit Friday (North West England)First Sunday after Pentecost: June 7Trinity SundayThursday after Trinity Sunday; 60 days after Easter, or the Sunday immediately following this: June 11Corpus Christi (feast):First Thursday after Corpus Christi: June 12Lajkonik (Kraków, Poland) 19 days after Pentecost: June 18Feast of the Sacred HeartSunday nearest to June 29: June 28Petertide (Anglican)

JulySecond Sunday in July: July 12Sea SundayLast Sunday in July: July 26Reek Sunday (Ireland)

AugustThird Weekend: August 15-16Festa do Rosário (Córrego Danta, Brazil)

SeptemberThursday following the first Sunday: September 6Jeûne genevois (Canton of Geneva, Switzerland)First Sunday after September 4: September 6Start of Wakes Week (Parts of England and Scotland) 
Abbots Bromley Horn Dance (Abbots Bromley, Staffordshire, England)Weekend after first Monday: September 7Feast of Sts Cosmas and Damian (Italian-American)Second Sunday: September 13Education Sunday (British Churches)
Racial Justice Sunday (British Churches)Third Sunday: September 20Federal Day of Thanksgiving, Repentance and Prayer (Switzerland) Monday after third Sunday: September 20Lundi du Jeûne: (Vaud, Switzerland20

OctoberFirst Sunday: October 4Day of Prayer for the Peace of Jerusalem (Pentecostal Christianity) 
World Communion Sunday Second Sunday: October 11White Sunday (Tonga, Samoa)Last Sunday: October 25Feast of Christ the King (Tridentine Mass Catholics)

NovemberSaturday between October 31 – November 6: All Saints' Day (Finland and Sweden only) Second Sunday before Advent: November 8Volkstrauertag (Germany)Second Wednesday before the First Sunday in Advent: November 11Buß- und Bettag (Saxony, Germany, Lutheran, Reformed (Calvinist) and United denominations)Sunday nearest November 11: November 14Remembrance Sunday (United Kingdom and certain Commonwealth countries)Last Sunday before First Advent Sunday: November 22Feast of Christ the King (Roman Catholic)
Stir-up Sunday (Anglican Church)
Totensonntag (mainly Lutheran)
World Youth Day (Next International-level World Youth Day will be in August 2023 Roman Catholicism)Fourth Sunday before Christmas Day: November 29  Advent Sunday (start of Advent, Western Christianity)

DecemberFirst Friday: December 4 Gospel Day (Marshall Islands) First Sunday: December 6First Presidency's Christmas Devotional (The Church of Jesus Christ of Latter-day Saints)Seven days, starting on First Monday: December 7-13 Chalica (Unitarian Universalism)Sunday two weeks before Christmas: December 13  Detinjci (Serbia)Second-final Sunday before Christmas Day: December 13 Gaudete Sunday (Western Christianity)Thursday  of the last full week before Christmas: December 17Chewidden Thursday (Cornwall) 
National Regifting Day (United States) Last Friday before Christmas: December 18 Black Friday (partying) (secular, United Kingdom)Last Saturday before Christmas: December 19 Super Saturday (secular, United States) Sunday before Christmas: December 20 Christmas Sunday 
Honesty Day (Italy) Winter Solstice: December 21 Blue Christmas (holiday)The Sunday between Christmas Day and New Year's Day (both exclusive), or December 30 if both Christmas Day and the Solemnity of Mary, Mother of God are Sundays: December 27'''
Feast of the Holy Family (Roman Catholicism)

See also
List of movable Eastern Christian observances

Western Christian